Saverio Bettinelli (18 July 1718 – 13 September 1808) was an Italian Jesuit writer.

became known as a polymath, dramatist, polemicist, poet, and literary critic.

Life

He was born at Mantua; there and later in Bologna, he studied under the Jesuits, till entering in novitiate in 1736, then formally consecrated as a priest in 1738.

He first taught literature from 1739 to 1744 at Brescia, where Cardinal Quirini, Count Federico Mazzuchelli, Count Duranti and other scholars, formed an illustrious academy. He next went to Bologna, to study divinity. There he was in contact with the circle including the poet Marini, Algarotti, and Zanotti. At the age of thirty he went to Venice, where he became professor of rhetoric. The superintendence of the college of nobles at Parma was entrusted to him in 1751; and he had principal charge of the studies of poetry and history, and the entertainments of the theatre. He remained there eight years, visiting, at intervals, other cities of Italy, often on the affairs of his order.

In 1755-1758 he undertook a series of journeys. First travelling to Germany in 1755, proceeded as far as Strasbourg and Nancy. He returned to Italy as a tutor to the sons of the Prince of Hohenlohe. The year following, he journeyed again to France, along with the eldest of his pupils; and during this excursion he wrote his famous Lettere dieci di Virgilio agli Arcadi, which were published at Venice. Bettinelli was also a poet of arcadic verse, collected in his Versi sciolti of 1758 and inspired by Frugoni and Algarotti, and of some tragedies including Gionata (1774), Demetrio Poliorcete (1758), Serse (1764) that were put on for the jesuit theater. In 1758 he went to Lorraine, to the court of King Stanislaus, who sent him on a matter of business to visit Voltaire. He would also meet in France with Rousseau.

From Geneva he returned to Parma, where he arrived in 1759.  He afterwards lived for some years at Verona and Modena, and he had just been appointed professor of rhetoric there, when, in 1773, the suppression of the Jesuit Order occurred in Italy, he had to abandon his teaching post at Modena, Bettinelli returned home, and resumed his literary labours with new ardor. The siege of Mantua by the French compelled him to leave the city, and he retired to Verona, where he formed an intimate friendship with the chevalier Hippolito Pindemonti.

His major works are the literary criticisms and observations of culture. In 1757, he penned a series of letters addressed to Virgil in which he criticized the Divine Comedy by Dante Alighieri, and affirmed that Among the erudite books, only certain parts from the Divine Comedy should be included, and these would form no more than five cantos  Voltaire was to praise his idiosyncratic opinions.

In 1766 he wrote Lettere inglesi where he proposes good taste in modern literature. In the enthusiasm of fine arts or Dell'entusiasmo delle belle arti, from 1769, where he exalts enthusiasm as a source of inspiration for fantasy in art according to a tendency that was pre-romantic.

Among his main works is a sketch of the progress of literature, science, fine arts, industry, and customs in Italy, originally title Risorgimento negli studi, nelle, Arti e ne' Costumi dopo di Mille.

In 1797 he returned to Mantua. Though nearly eighty years old, he resumed his labors and his customary manner of life. He undertook in 1799 a complete edition of his works, which was published at Venice in 24 vols. At this death at the age of 90 years, he still retained his gaiety and vivacity of mind.

References

Attribution

Works
 Saverio Bettinelli, Dieci Lettere di Publio Virgilio Marone scritte dagli Elisi all'Arcadia di  Rome sopra gli abusi introdotti nella poesia italiana, Venezia: Fenzo, 1758
 Saverio Bettinelli, Dodici Lettere Inglesi sopra varii argomenti e sopra la letteratura italiana, Venezia: Pasquali, 1766
 Opere edite e inedite in prosa e in versi dell'abate Saverio Bettinelli, Venezia: Presso Adolfo Cesare, 1799-1801, in 24 volumi 

1718 births
1808 deaths
18th-century Italian Jesuits
Clergy from Mantua
Members of the Academy of Arcadians
Italian dramatists and playwrights
Italian poets
Italian male poets
Italian literary critics
Italian male dramatists and playwrights
Italian male non-fiction writers
Writers from Mantua